Voldemārs Viņķis (14 October 1903 – 1954) was a Latvian footballer. He played in one match for the Latvia national football team in 1924. He was also part of Latvia's squad for the football tournament at the 1924 Summer Olympics, but he did not play in any matches.

References

External links
 

1903 births
1954 deaths
Latvian footballers
Latvia international footballers
Place of birth missing
Association football midfielders